John Harris (21 July 1841 – 25 August 1887) was a Canadian businessman.  He was the eldest son of Alanson Harris, founder of A. Harris, Son and Company, a farm implement company that was a predecessor to Massey-Harris and subsequently Massey Ferguson.

Harris married Alice Jane Tufford of Beamsville in 1863 and had 9 children including businessman and politician Lloyd Harris.

Born in Townsend Township in Norfolk County, Ontario, Harris died in Brantford, Ontario in 1887.

References

External links 

 

1841 births
1887 deaths
Canadian manufacturing businesspeople